Anderson Denyro Cueto Sánchez (born 29 May 1989) is a Peruvian footballer who plays as a winger for Juan Aurich in the Peruvian Segunda División.

Club career
Cueto began his career in youth ranks of Sporting Cristal. Then in July 2008 he left Cristal and joined Polish club Lech Poznan. After a two years in Poznań, Cueto returned to Sporting Cristal in July 2010.
With Cristal he made 11 appearances and scored one goal for the remaining second half of the 2010 season.
On January 11, 2011 Anderson left Cristal and signed a 3-year contract with Club Juan Aurich. On January 29, 2013 Cueto signed for Peruvian giant Alianza Lima.

Honours

Club 
Juan Aurich
 Torneo Descentralizado (1): 2011

References

External links
 
 
 peru.com
 

1989 births
Living people
Footballers from Lima
Peruvian footballers
Peruvian expatriate footballers
Sporting Cristal footballers
Lech Poznań players
Juan Aurich footballers
Club Alianza Lima footballers
Real Garcilaso footballers
Sport Victoria players
Sport Boys footballers
Peruvian Primera División players
Peruvian Segunda División players
Expatriate footballers in Poland
Peruvian expatriate sportspeople in Poland
Association football wingers